Monida is an unincorporated community in Beaverhead County, Montana, United States. The community is situated on the Continental Divide at the Idaho state line. It has a permanent population of two. It also serves as the southernmost settlement in the state.

The Monida post office opened in 1891. The name derives from the first three letters of Montana and Idaho.

References

Unincorporated communities in Beaverhead County, Montana
Unincorporated communities in Montana
Great Divide of North America